Pavel Sorokin may refer to:
Pavel Sorokin (painter) (1836/39 - 1886), Russian painter
Pavel Sorokin (conductor) (born 1963), Russian conductor